Cattolica Eraclea is a comune (municipality) in the Province of Agrigento in the Italian region Sicily, located about  south of Palermo and about  northwest of Agrigento nearby the Platani river valley.

The town was founded in medieval times. It received the name "Eraclea" in 1874, associating it to the ancient site of Heraclea Minoa nearby.

The economy is based on agriculture, including production of vine, olives, agrumes, fruit, almonds, cereals and wheat.

References

External links
 Official website

Cities and towns in Sicily